The 63d Bombardment Squadron is an inactive United States Air Force unit that was last assigned to the 43rd Bombardment Wing at Little Rock Air Force Base, Arkansas, where it was inactivated on 31 January 1970.

The squadron was first activated in January 1941, as one of the original squadrons of the 43rd Bombardment Group.  Following the attack on Pearl Harbor, the squadron participated in antisubmarine patrols until January 1942, when it moved to Australia and the Southwest Pacific Theater.  It moved forward with US forces through New Guinea and the Philippines, moving to Ie Shima shortly before V-J Day for operations against Japan.  It earned two Distinguished Unit Citations and a Philippine Presidential Unit Citation for combat operations.  The squadron was inactivated in the Philippines in April 1946.

The squadron was activated again in October 1946, when it assumed the resources of another unit.  It operated propeller-driven Boeing B-29 Superfortresses and Boeing B-50 Superfortresses until 1954, when it upgraded to the jet Boeing B-47 Stratojet.  In 1960, the squadron moved to Carswell Air Force Base, Texas, where it became one of the Air Force's first supersonic Convair B-58 Hustler units.  It continued to operate the Hustler until it was inactivated.

History

World War II

Initial organization and training
The squadron was first activated at Langley Field, Virginia as one of the original four squadrons of the 43d Bombardment Group, in the buildup of the United States military forces prior to the American entry into World War II.  It was equipped with a variety of aircraft, not only the Boeing B-17 Flying Fortress that it would fly in combat, but also Douglas B-18 Bolos and North American B-25 Mitchells for training.

The squadron moved to Army Air Base Bangor, Maine at the end of August.  Following the Japanese attack on Pearl Harbor, the squadron conducted antisubmarine patrols off the Atlantic coast, with the LB-30 export version of the Consolidated B-24 Liberator until January 1942, when it began moving to reinforce American forces in the Southwest Pacific Theater.

Combat in the Pacific

The squadron reached Australia via Cape Town in March 1942.  It was originally equipped with B-17s for combat operations.  The squadron operated from bases in Australia until January 1943, when it moved to New Guinea.  Between May and September 1942 the squadron replaced its B-17s with Consolidated B-24 Liberators, believed to be more suited to the long ranges of many Pacific missions.  It attacked Japanese shipping in the Netherlands East Indies and the Bismarck Archipelago.  It experimented with skip bombing and used this technique during the Battle of the Bismarck Sea in March 1943.  During this battle, it made repeated attacks against an enemy convoy bringing reinforcements to Japanese forces in New Guinea.  For this action, the squadron was awarded a Distinguished Unit Citation.  During this period, the squadron also provided air support for ground forces in New Guinea.  It attacked airfields and enemy installations in New Guinea, the Bismarck Archipelago, Celebes, Halmahera, Yap, Palau, and the southern Philippines.

In November 1944 the squadron moved to the Philippines, helping the ground campaign on Luzon as well as conducting bombing missions against airfields, industrial installations and enemy installations in China and Formosa. In July 1945 it moved to Ie Shima Airfield, from which it flew missions over Japan, attacking railroads and airfields, as well as shipping in the Seto Inland Sea until V-J Day.  After ceasing operations, the squadron sent its aircraft to the Philippines for reclamation and relocated to Fort William McKinley as a paper unit.  It was finally inactivated in April 1946.

Strategic Air Command operations
Reactivated under Strategic Air Command at Davis-Monthan Field, Arizona on 1 October 1946 and, along with the other squadrons of the 43rd Group, absorbed the personnel and Boeing B-29 Superfortresses of the 40th and 444th Bombardment Groups, which were simultaneously inactivated.   One of the first operational B-29 squadrons of SAC, the squadron was not fully manned or equipped until 1948.   It trained for strategic bombardment missions during the postwar years; began upgrading to the improved Boeing B-50 Superfortress, an advanced version of the B-29 in 1948. The B-50 gave the unit the capability to  carry heavy loads of conventional weapons faster and farther as well as being designed for atomic bomb missions if necessary.

By 1951, the emergence of the Soviet MiG-15 interceptor in the skies of North Korea signaled the end of the propeller-driven B-50 as a first-line strategic bomber.  It replaced them with new Boeing B-47E Stratojet swept-wing medium bombers in 1954, capable of flying at high subsonic speeds and primarily designed for penetrating the airspace of the Soviet Union.  In the late 1950s, the B-47 was considered to be reaching obsolescence, and was being phased out of SAC's strategic arsenal. In preparation for receiving the new Convair B-58 Hustler supersonic medium bomber, sending the last of its B-47s to the Aerospace Maintenance and Regeneration Center (AMARC) in early 1960.

B-58 operations
The squadron moved to Carswell Air Force Base without personnel or equipment on 15 April 1960, and was not manned or equipped until August.  Then it took over personnel and equipment from the 3958th Combat Crew Training Squadron and the 6592d Test Squadron, which were discontinued.  The squadron immediately began training crews on the Convair B-58 Hustler.  The squadron was equipped with experimental and training models of the Hustler, along with Convair TF-102 Delta Daggers, to perform Category II and III evaluations of the new bomber, along with its training responsibilities.  The evaluations of the Hustler ended in 1962.

At the beginning of the Cuban Missile Crisis in October 1962, Only six B-58s in the entire SAC inventory were on alert. Even these aircraft were "second cycle" (follow on) sorties.  Crew training was suspended, and the squadron, along with SAC's other B-58 squadrons, began placing its bombers on alert.  By the first week of November, 84 B-58s were standing nuclear alert, and as SAC redeployed its Boeing KC-135 Stratotankers, 20 of these were "first cycle" sorties. Within a short time, this grew to 41 bombers.  By 20 November, SAC resumed its normal alert posture, and half the squadron's aircraft were kept on alert.

In September 1964, the 43d Wing and the squadron moved to Little Rock Air Force Base, Arkansas.  In December 1965, Robert S. McNamara, Secretary of Defense announced a phaseout program that would further reduce SAC's bomber force. This program called for the mid-1971 retirement of all B-58s and some Boeing B-52 Stratofortress models.  With the removal of the B-58 from SAC's bomber force, the squadron was inactivated at the end of January 1970.

Lineage
 Constituted as the 63d Bombardment Squadron (Heavy) on 20 November 1940
 Activated on 15 January 1941
 Redesignated 63d Bombardment Squadron, Heavy on 21 September 1943
 Inactivated on 29 April 1946
 Redesignated 63d Bombardment Squadron, Very Heavy and activated, on 1 October 1946
 Redesignated 63d Bombardment Squadron, Medium on 2 July 1948
 Inactivated 31 January 1970

Assignments
 43rd Bombardment Group, 15 January 1941 – 29 April 1946
 43rd Bombardment Group, 1 October 1946
 43rd Bombardment Wing, 16 June 1952 – 31 January 1970

Stations

 Langley Field, Virginia, 15 January 1941
 Army Air Base, Bangor, Maine, 28 August 1941 – 17 February 1942
 Sydney Airport, Australia, 28 March 1942
 Charleville Airport, Australia, 15 June 1942
 Longreach Airport Torrens Creek, Australia, 3 August 1942
 Mareeba Airfield, Australia, 20 August 1942
 Jackson Airfield, Port Moresby, New Guinea, 23 January 1943
 Dobodura Airfield, New Guinea, 29 October 1943
 Nadzab Airfield, New Guinea, April 1944
 Owi Airfield, Schouten Islands, Netherlands East Indies, 20 July 1944
 Tacloban Airfield, Leyte, Philippines, 23 November 1944
 Clark Field, Luzon, Philippines, 19 March 1945
 Ie Shima Airfield, Okinawa, 25 July 1945
 Fort William McKinley, Luzon, Philippines, 10 December 1945 – 29 April 1946
 Davis-Monthan Field (later Davis-Monthan Air Force Base), Arizona, 1 October 1946
 Carswell Air Force Base, Texas, 15 March 1960
 Little Rock Air Force Base, Arkansas, 1 September 1964 – 31 January 1970

Aircraft

 Douglas B-18 Bolo 1941–1942
 North American B-25, 1941–1942
 Consolidated LB-30 Liberator, 1941–1942
 Boeing B-17 Flying Fortress, 1941–1942, 1942–1943
 Consolidated B-24 Liberator, 1942–1945
 Boeing B-29 Superfortress, 1946–1950
 Boeing B-50 Superfortress, 1948–1954
 Boeing B-47 Stratojet, 1954–1960
 Convair B-58 Hustler, 1960–1970

Awards and campaigns

See also
 United States Army Air Forces in Australia
 B-17 Flying Fortress units of the United States Army Air Forces
 B-24 Liberator units of the United States Army Air Forces
 List of B-47 units of the United States Air Force

References

Notes
 Explanatory notes

 Citations

Bibliography

  (subscription required for web access)
 
 
 
 
 
 
 

063
063
Military units and formations established in 1941
Units and formations of Strategic Air Command
Military units and formations of the United States in the Cold War
World War II strategic bombing units